Pottawatomie County is a county located in the U.S. state of Oklahoma. As of the 2020 census, the population was 72,454. Its county seat is Shawnee.

Pottawatomie County is part of the Shawnee, OK Micropolitan Statistical Area, which is included in the Oklahoma City–Shawnee, OK Combined Statistical Area.

History
Pottawatomie County was carved out of land originally given to the Creek and Seminole after their forced removal from Georgia and Florida. After the Civil War, the Creek and Seminole were forced to cede their lands back to the federal government, and the area of Pottawatomie County was used to resettle the Iowa, Sac and Fox, Absentee Shawnee, Potawatomi and Kickapoo tribes.

Non-Indian settlement began on September 22, 1891, when all the tribes except the Kickapoo agreed to land allotment, where communal reservation land was divided and allotted to individual members of the tribes. The remaining land was opened to settlement.

During the land run, Pottawatomie County was organized as County "B" with Tecumseh as the county seat. In 1892, the voters of the county elected to rename County "B" as Pottawatomie County after the Potawatomi Indians.

In 1895, the Kickapoo gave up their land rights and their land was given away to white settlers in the last land run in Oklahoma.

In 1930, Shawnee, now bigger in size than Tecumseh, was approved by the voters to become the new county seat. The Pottawatomie County Court House was built in 1934 by the Public Works Administration. The court house project cost $250,000 to complete.

On May 19, 2013, during an outbreak of tornadoes, a mobile home park was nearly destroyed, killing a 79-year-old man and injuring at least six others as well as damaging at least 35 structures. Frame and brick homes west of Shawnee were also affected.

Geography

Adjacent counties
 Lincoln County (north)
 Okfuskee County (northeast)
 Seminole County (east)
 Pontotoc County (southeast)
 McClain County (southwest)
 Cleveland County (west)
 Oklahoma County (northwest)

Demographics

As of the census of 2010, there were 69,442 people, 25,911 households, and 18,227 families residing in the county.  The population density was 34/km2 (88/mi2).  There were 29,139 housing units at an average density of 14/km2 (37/mi2).  The racial makeup of the county was 76.3% white, 2.9% black or African American, 12.9% Native American, 0.6% Asian, 0.1% Pacific Islander, 0.1% from other races, and 6.3% from two or more races.  About 4% of the population were Hispanic or Latino of any race, while 9% were of American, 17% German, 14% Irish and 10% English ancestry.  About 90.6% spoke English and 4.2% Spanish as their first language.

There were 25,911 households, out of which 34.5% included children under the age of 18, 51.9% were married couples living together, 13.3% had a female householder with no husband present, 5.1% had a male householder with no wife present, and 29.7% were non-families.  About a quarter of households consisted of a single individual and 9.8% had someone living alone who was 65 years of age or older.  The average household size was 2.56 and the average family size was 3.04.

In the county, the population was spread out, with 25% under the age of 18, 10.2% from 18 to 24, 24.6% from 25 to 44, 25.9% from 45 to 64, and 14.3% who were 65 years of age or older.  The median age was 37 years. For every 100 females, there were 92.1 males.  For every 100 females age 18 and over, there were 88 males.

The median income for a household in the county was $41,332, and the median income for a family was $50,399.  Males had a median income of $39,580 versus $27,495 for females. The per capita income for the county was $20,700.  About 14% of families and 18% of the population were below the poverty line, including 26.4% of those under age 18 and 10.3% of those age 65 or over.

Government and infrastructure
The Pioneer Library System operates branch libraries in nine cities in Pottawatomie, Cleveland, and McClain counties.

The Oklahoma Department of Corrections operates the Mabel Bassett Correctional Center in an unincorporated area in the county, near McLoud.

Politics

Transportation

Major highways

  Interstate 40
  U.S. Highway 177
  U.S. Highway 270
  U.S. Highway 377
  State Highway 3
  State Highway 3E
  State Highway 3W
  State Highway 9
  State Highway 9A
  State Highway 18
  State Highway 39
  State Highway 59
  State Highway 59B
  State Highway 99
  State Highway 99A
  State Highway 102
  State Highway 270

Airport
It is classified as a general aviation airport.

Communities

Cities
 Oklahoma City (mostly in Oklahoma County)
 Shawnee (county seat)
 Tecumseh

Towns

 Asher
 Bethel Acres
 Brooksville
 Earlsboro
 Johnson
 Macomb
 Maud
 McLoud
 Pink
 St. Louis
 Tribbey
 Wanette

Census-designated place
 Dale

Other unincorporated communities

 Aydelotte
 Bellemont
 Harjo
 Pearson
 Romulus
 Sacred Heart

Education
School districts include:

K-12:

 Asher Public Schools
 Bethel Public Schools
 Dale Public Schools
 Earlsboro Public Schools
 Harrah Public Schools
 Konawa Public Schools
 Little Axe Public Schools
 Macomb Public Schools
 Maud Public Schools
 McLoud Public Schools
 Meeker Public Schools
 North Rock Creek Public School
 Prague Public Schools
 Shawnee Public Schools
 Strother Public Schools
 Tecumseh Public Schools
 Wanette Public Schools

Elementary only:
 Grove Public School
 Pleasant Grove Public School
 South Rock Creek Public School

NRHP Sites

The following sites in Pottawatomie County are listed on the National Register of Historic Places:

References

External links
 Pottawatomie County Sheriff's Office
 Pottawatomie County, Oklahoma
 Charles W. Mooney Jr., Localized History of Pottawatomie County, Oklahoma to 1907, 1971

 
Oklahoma City metropolitan area
1891 establishments in Oklahoma Territory
Populated places established in 1891